is a Japanese-language daily newspaper based in Kobe, Japan, and the company publishing that newspapers is also called .

External links
 Kobe Shimbun Webnews

Daily newspapers published in Japan
Mass media in Kobe
Companies based in Kobe